is a district located in Fukui Prefecture, Japan.

As of October 1, 2005, the district has an estimated population of 11,023 and a density of 72.37 persons per km2. The total area is 152.32 km2.

Towns and villages
The district has one town:

 Mihama

History

Recent mergers
 On March 31, 2005 - The town of Mikata merged with the town of Kaminaka (from Onyū District), forming the new town of Wakasa (in the newly created Mikatakaminaka District).

Districts in Fukui Prefecture